Wongawallan is a rural locality in the City of Gold Coast, Queensland, Australia. In the  Wongawallan had a population of 1,273 people.

Geography
Wongawallan is mountainous terrain with most farming and residential development occurring the creek valleys. The hilltops are largely undeveloped.

The main creeks are Wongawallan Creek and Tamborine Creek. Tamborine Creek joins Wongawallan creek at   close to Welch Pioneer Park. Wongawallan Creek is a tributary of the Coomera River; their confluence is in neighbouring Maudsland.

The Tamborine-Oxenford Road is the main road to and through the locality.

History
The area was originally named Mount Goulburn after Henry Goulburn by surveyor Dixon. However, later it was renamed Wongawallan, believed to be an Aboriginal word where wonga means pigeon and walla means water.

However, it has been claimed that it was named after an Aboriginal man nicknamed "Peter" who killed John Wilkinson, a settler, at Wongawallan Creek in 1876., but contemporaneous newspaper reports of the death of Wilkinson only refer to the Aboriginal man as "Peter".

In the  Wongawallan had a population of 1,273 people.

Heritage listings 
There are a number of heritage-listed sites in Wongawallan, including:

 Welch Pioneer Park, 881 Tamborine-Oxenford Road: Grave of Elizabeth Welch

Education
There are no schools in Wongawallan. The nearest government primary schools are Highlands Reserve State School and Upper Coomera State College, both in neighbouring Upper Coomera to the east, and Tamborine Mountain State School in neighbouring Tamborine Mountain to the south-west. The nearest government secondary schools are Upper Coomera State College in neighbouring Upper Coomera to the east and Tamborine Mountain State High School in neighbouring Tamborine Mountain to the south-east.

Amenities
There are a number of parks in the locality, including:

 Cresthill Drive Reserve
 Eagle Heights Conservation Area

 Gladrose Reserve

 Hayes Park

 Howard Creek Reserve

 Lanes Park

 Pinnacle Park

 Solomon Lane Reserve

 Tamborine Creek Reserve

 Tamborine Oxenford Road Bend Reserve

 Tamborine Recreation Reserve

 Timberview Drive Reserve

 Timberview Drive Park

 Valley View Vista Park

 Walter Park

 Waterfall Drive Northern Park

 Waterfall Drive Southern Park

 Welch Pioneer Park

 Wongawallan Conservation Area

 Wongawallan Reserve

 Wongawallan Road Reserve

 Wongawallen Junction Reserve

References

Sources

External links
  — includes Wongawallan

Suburbs of the Gold Coast, Queensland
Localities in Queensland